Srinivas Udgata (born 6 January 1935), is a poet, story and drama writer, painter, novelist and translator from Odisha, India.

List of works

Books
 Purnima
 Parbati
 Dibya Purusha
 Kipari Kahibi Mu 
 Ranipadra O' Anyanya Kahani
 Chhada Anchala Mahabahu
 Sei Subasita Atmati
 Khali Tharute
 Rutam (Collection of Poems)

Novels
 Nila Nayana Tale
 Kanta
 Sesha Ratrira Prathama Sakala
 Shilara Sapana
 Ahira Bhairaba
 Byaghrarohan
 Sesha Chitau
 Bhari Kathina se preeti paliba

Awards and recognitions
He has been awarded Padma Shri award in 2008 by the president of India in 2008 for Literature and Education. He received the Jhankar Award in 1974. In 2002 for his poetry he has received Bharati Bharati Award for his From the Hindi Sahitya Sanstha of Uttar Pradesh. Besides these awards, he has also received the Sarala Award in 2002, Sarala Samman in 2002 and Acharya Vidyasagar Samman from Calcutta. He was honored with Bidhubhusan Guru Smruti Samman in 2022 by Bidhubhusan Guru Smruti Parishad. He received his D.Litt. from Sambalpur University. The title "Vidyavachaspati" awarded by Prayag Sahitya Sammelan, Allahabad, Award from Kendriya Sahitya Akademi, U.P. Hindi Sahitya Sansthan, Lucknow- Souhardya Samman etc. He was president of Orissa Sahitya Akademi from 1994 to 1997. He is continuing as president of Atmaprakashani (A Writers' Association). He has been awarded & honored by more than 100 organisations in India.

References 

1935 births
Living people
Odia-language writers
20th-century Indian translators
Recipients of the Padma Shri in literature & education
People from Balangir
20th-century Indian novelists
Novelists from Odisha
Indian male novelists
20th-century Indian male writers